Jason Ward may refer to:
 Jason Ward (Gaelic footballer)
 Jason Ward (ice hockey) (born 1979), Canadian hockey player
 Jason Ward (naturalist), American naturalist
 Jason Ward (singer/songwriter) (born 1983), American singer/songwriter